Grace Murray Hopper Park is a small memorial park in Arlington, Virginia. The park is named in honor of Grace Hopper, a computer scientist and naval officer.  The park is near Riverhouse, a high-rise community where Hopper lived her later years.  The park was originally funded by private sources, but is now owned by Arlington.  The park is located across the I-395 corridor from The Pentagon.

Hopper, Grace Murray Park